Wamanripa (local name for Senecio or a species of it, also applied for Laccopetalum giganteum, hispanicized spelling Huamanrripa) is a mountain in the Andes of Peru, about  high. It is located in the Lima Region, Huaura Province, Santa Leonor District.

References

Mountains of Peru
Mountains of Lima Region